With or Without You is a 1992 Hong Kong action film directed by Taylor Wong and starring Jacky Cheung, Leon Lai, Rosamund Kwan and Ng Man-tat. Due to the popularity of Cheung's role as the antagonist, "Prince", a prequel to the film, titled No More Love, No More Death, which focuses on the character of "Prince", was released the following year.

Plot
One day, police officer Ming (Leon Lai) meets Tweedy (Rosamund Kwan) in the streets and develops a crush on her and follows her to a bar where she works at in order to woo her, while in the pretense of interrogating her. Later, when Ming broke up with his girlfriend, he goes to Tweedy's bar where they have a chat before Ming gets drunk and accidentally drops his issued pistol. Fortunately, Ming receives a tip about a firearms trade between Ming's informant, Chiu (Yu Kwok-lok), and triad leader, Mute (Anthony Cho). Chiu then discovers that Tweedy is Mute is an accomplice of Mute and chases after her, which caught the attention of Ming. When Chiu tells Ming that his pistol is hidden in the male's bathroom, Ming unexpectedly sees Tweedy outside the bathroom, leading him to mistakenly believe that she was involved in the trade. When Ming was unable to find his pistol, he goes the bar to look for Tweedy, much to the displeasure of her boss, Tung (John Ching). At this time, Mute also shoots and kills Chiu, and Ming chases after Mute before losing him. At the murder scene, Ming discovers that the bullet cannot be found and while he searches for it, Tweedy had given the bullet to Tat (Ng Man-tat). When Mute finds out that Ming is going to arrest Tweedy, Mute surrenders himself to Ming, and tells Ming the whereabouts of his lost pistol. After find his pistol, Ming receives news of triad hitman, Prince's (Jacky Cheung), return to Hong Kong. Through the files of Prince, Ming discovers that Tweedy is Prince's girlfriend. When Prince returns, he goes to Tweedy's bar, where at this time, Tung was causing a scene and bullying woman with alcohol. At the same time, Ming also arrives to present a birthday gift to Tweedy, which angers Prince when she choose Ming over him. Using explosives he carries on him, Prince threatens Ming and manages to escape the surrounding of the police by using hostages, where he drives away in his sports car with Tweedy. Ming chases after Prince and a gunfight ensues between them. Later, as Prince attempts to drive away, he was pushed to the docks and surrounded by the police. When Prince sees how Tweedy is deeply in love with Ming and how he himself was doomed with no way out, he drives into the sea and commits suicide.

Cast
Leon Lai as Ming
Jacky Cheung as Prince
Rosamund Kwan as Tweedy
Ng Man-tat as Tat
Margaret Lee as Sister Ha
John Ching as Tung
Yu Kwok-lok as Chiu
James Ha as Tung's thug
Anthony Cho as Mute
Chan Tat-kwong as Tung's thug
Kong Miu-deng as Tung's thug
Yip San as Ming's girlfriend
Jacky Cheung Chun-ming as Gangster
Fan Chin-hung as Gangster
Chan Wai-to as Gangster

Theme song
Love Belongs to Abjection (情歸落泊)
Composer: Marc Almond
Lyricist: Lau Cheuk-fai
Singer: Leon Lai
Understanding My Heart (明明白白我的心)
Composer/Lyricist: Jonathan Lee
Singer: Jackie Chan, Sarah Chen

Box office
The film grossed HK$9,601,534 at the Hong Kong box office during its theatrical run from 21 May to 4 June 1992.

See also
Jacky Cheung filmography

References

External links

With or Without You at Hong Kong Cinemagic

1992 films
1990s romantic action films
Hong Kong romantic action films
Police detective films
Triad films
Gun fu films
1990s Cantonese-language films
Films about contract killing
Films set in Hong Kong
Films shot in Hong Kong
Films directed by Taylor Wong
1990s Hong Kong films